Puducherry or Pondicherry may refer to:
 Puducherry (union territory), a union territory of India
 Pondicherry, capital of the union territory of Puducherry
 Puducherry district, a district of the union territory of Puducherry
 Puducherry taluk, a taluk of the union territory of Puducherry
 Puducherry (Lok Sabha constituency), a parliament constituency comprising the union territory of Puducherry
Pondicherry (film), 2022 Marathi film
 Pondicherry shark
 Pondicherry University
 Puducherry Technological University
 Puducherry football team
 Bridgton, Maine or Pondicherry

See also
 Battle of Pondicherry
 Siege of Pondicherry (disambiguation)